Stoelmans Eiland Airstrip  is an airstrip serving Stoelmanseiland, an island on the eastern border of Suriname.

Charters and destinations 

Charter Airlines serving this airport are:

Incidents and Accidents 
 On 15 May 1974 a Cessna 172K Skyhawk, registered PZ-NAB, from the Aero Club Suriname was written off at Stoelmans Eiland. There were no fatalities, the pilot was G. Brunings.
 On 23 August 1974 a Cessna 337E Super Skymaster, registered PZ-PAS, from the Pater Albrinck Stichting was damaged at Stoelmans Eiland, the pilot was F. Siem Tjam.
 On 9 October 1982 a Dornier DO 28D-1 Skyservant from Gum Air registered PZ-TBB and piloted by P.Gummels was damaged at Stoelmans Eiland, the airplane was later repaired.
 On 18 October 1986 a De Havilland Canada DHC6-300 Twin Otter from the Surinaamse Luchtvaart Maatschappij, registered PZ-TCD, was hijacked by the Jungle Commando at Stoelmans Eiland, after landing. The airplane had departed Paramaribo, Zorg en Hoop Airport with 4 people on board. Lloyds paid FL 500000 to get the aircraft back. The hijacking lasted less than 1 day, there were 5 hijackers. The same airplane was sold years later, in 2005 to Gum Air, and is still flying in Suriname now registered PZ-TBY.

See also

 List of airports in Suriname
 Transport in Suriname

References

External links
FallingRain - Stoelmans Eisland
OurAirports - Stoelmans Eiland
OpenStreetMap - Stoelmans

Airports in Suriname
Sipaliwini District